Ganpataul is a village in the Begusarai District of the Indian state of Bihar. It lies some 36 kilometres north of Begusarai, in the Mansurchak Block.

References

Villages in Begusarai district